Deep Dasgupta (born 7 June 1977) is a former Indian cricketer who played in eight Test matches and five One Day Internationals between 2001 and 2006 as the national wicketkeeper and was later replaced by Ajay Ratra. He is now a Hindi and English commentator.

He later joined the Indian Cricket League, where he played for the Royal Bengal Tigers. Nowadays he is a commentator.

Early life 
Although born in Kolkata and Bengali by birth, Dasgupta grew up in Delhi.

Education 
Dasgupta studied at the Sardar Patel Vidyalaya, New Delhi.

Cricket career 
Dasgupta started his career as an opening batsman-wicketkeeper. His ability behind the stumps and on the crease placed him to become a reliable member of the Bengal Ranji Squad. 

Dasgupta was included in India's squad to South Africa in 2001. Dasgupta's debut series was an eventful one, in which the famous incident involving Mike Denness took place. Dasgupta was one of the six cricketers along with Sachin Tendulkar, Sehwag, Ganguly, Harbhajan Singh, and Shiv Sunder Das to be banned by Denness for one Test. While Tendulkar was banned for ball-tampering, Ganguly was banned for ‘inability to control the behavior of his team’. The rest, including Dasgupta, were suspended for excessive appeal.

Dasgupta scored a century against England in the Test series of 2001.

Later he continued with Bengal in the Ranji trophy. Deep Dasgupta has been one of the most successful captains the Bengal Ranji team has ever had. He is only the second captain after Sambaran Banerjee to lead the team to two Ranji Trophy finals in consecutive seasons (06-07). Both times they lost to Uttar Pradesh and Mumbai respectively.

Cricket commentary 
Dasgupta is currently a commentator in India and can be seen doing that very often during the Indian Premier League and was also the part of commentary team during the ICC World T20 2016 in India.

Personal life 
After a courtship of three years, Dasgupta married Amrita.

References

1977 births
Living people
Indian cricketers
India One Day International cricketers
India Test cricketers
Bengal cricketers
East Zone cricketers
ICL India XI cricketers
Royal Bengal Tigers cricketers
Wicket-keepers